Joe Basquez is an American songwriter, composer and musician from Austin, Texas.  He is best known for his work at Origin Systems Inc, specifically, his compositions for Ultima Online in collaboration with Kirk Winterrowd.

Video game credits
1993-2001 - Origin Systems Inc. (See credits below)

A-10 (PC) - music and sound design
Abuse (PC) - music
ATF (PC) - music
Bioforge Missions (PC) - SFX
F-15 (PC) - Music
Fighter Pilot (PC) - music
Jane's Longbow 2 (PC) - music
Prowler (3DO) - SFX and music
Super Wing Commander (3DO) - SFX and music
Ultima Online (PC) - Sound design and music (in collaboration with Kirk Winterrowd)
Ultima Online: The Second Age (PC) - SFX
Ultima Ascension (PC) - Sound design and SFX
Wing Commander III (3DO) - Stream editing
Wing Commander Prophecy (PC) - Sound design
Wing Commander: Secret Ops (PC) - Audio Design
Wing Commander: The Kilrathi Saga (PC) - Remastering

Film/music credits
1990
Ninth Life - Composer

2002
American Spirit campaign - Composer

2003
The Alamo - Supporting - Tejano
Extra Notes - 13 Days at the Alamo - CD Release

2004
Sin City - Supporting - Bartender
A Scanner Darkly - Supporting - Undercover Cop
J.F. Que? - Composer
Idiocracy - Supporting - Prisoner
The Quiet - Supporting" - Usher
We Won It All Once - Principal - Jim Loney
La Pastorela - Composer and Sound Designer

2005
The Adventures of Shark Boy and Lava Girl -
Stand-In - George Lopez
Oil Storm - Supporting - Ranch Hand
Infamous - Supporting - Ranch Hand
The Return - Supporting - Crony
Los Aires del Senor Verde - Crew
State vs Reed - Composer
Blade of the King - Composer and Sound Designer
Hello Officer!" - Composer
The Reckoning - Composer
Petra's Pecado - Composer and Sound Designer

2006
Grind House - Supporting - Doctor
Rosita's Jalapeno Kitchen - Sound Designer
Petra's Cuento - Sound Designer

2007
OMG! Zombies! - Composer
I Am Not A Werewolf - Composer

2008
Repentance - Composer

References

External links

American Spirit Campaign
Legacy: A Celebration of James Welch in the Seattle Times
Moby Games
Blade of the King Concept Trailer
The Reckoning Press Release
NALIP Newsletter - Teatro Vivo Presents Petra's Pecado

Living people
Songwriters from Texas
Video game musicians
Musicians from Austin, Texas
Writers from Austin, Texas
Year of birth missing (living people)